William Duane Morgan (1817–1887) was a newspaper editor and Democratic politician. He owned papers in the U.S. states of Pennsylvania and later Ohio. He was also Ohio State Auditor 1852-1856.

William Duane Morgan was born to a prominent family in Washington County, Pennsylvania. In 1837, he and his brother, Thomas Jefferson Morgan, owned and edited the Washington County Democratic newspaper Our Country.

In 1840 he moved to New Lisbon, Ohio, where he owned the Ohio Patriot. He was nominated at the state Democratic Party convention for Ohio State Auditor in 1851, and defeated his Free Soil Party and incumbent Whig opponents in the general election. He served a four-year term, but was defeated by Republican Francis Mastin Wright for re-election. He then owned the Newark Advocate in Newark, Ohio from 1856 to 1880. He died in 1887.

Notes

References

People from Lisbon, Ohio
People from Washington County, Pennsylvania
Ohio Democrats
1817 births
1887 deaths
State Auditors of Ohio
19th-century American newspaper editors
American male journalists
19th-century American male writers
19th-century American politicians
Journalists from Pennsylvania